William Lenoir may refer to:
William Lenoir (general) (1751–1839), American Revolutionary War officer and later a general in the North Carolina militia
William Ballard Lenoir (1775–1852), his son, member of Tennessee state house of representatives, 1815–1817
William B. Lenoir (1939–2010), American engineer and NASA astronaut
Billy Lenoir (William Lenoir, 1942–2007), American tennis player